HBH may refer to:
 Bremerhaven Hauptbahnhof, a railway station in Germany
 H. B. Hollins (1854–1938), American financier
 Hebei Airlines
 Hemoglobin H
 Holdfast Bay Handicap, an Australian road running competition
 Team Halfords Bikehut, a British cycling team

Also see
 HbH